Caleb may refer to:

People
 Caleb (given name), a masculine name of Hebrew origin
 Caleb, son of Jephunneh: is a figure who appears in the Bible as a representative of Judah.
 Caleb, son of Hezron: another biblical Caleb.
 Caleb (footballer) (born 1992), full name Caleb Santos Jordão Rocha Carvalho, Brazilian footballer
 Caleb Widogast, a fictional human wizard in the D&D Web Series Critical Role

Others
Caleb may also refer to:

 NOTS-EV-2 Caleb, an American space launcher of the 1950s
 "Caleb", a song on the album Unia by Finnish metal band Sonata Arctica

See also
 Kaleb, King of Aksum
 Kalev (disambiguation)